The 1967 New Mexico State Aggies football team was an American football team that represented New Mexico State University as an independent during the 1967 NCAA University Division football season. In their tenth year under head coach Warren B. Woodson, the Aggies compiled a 7–2–1 record and outscored opponents by a total of 346 to 145. The team played its six home games at Memorial Stadium in Las Cruces, New Mexico.

The team's statistical leaders included quarterback Sal Olivas with 2,225 passing yards, running back Doug Dalton with 1,123 rushing yards, and Mike Carroll with 771 receiving yards.

Shortly after the season ended, Warren Woodson retired from his dual posts as the school's head football coach and athletic director. Woodson was within weeks of reaching the school's mandatory retirement age of 65 years.

Schedule

References

New Mexico State
New Mexico State Aggies football seasons
New Mexico State Aggies football